Nathaniel Henry "Nate" Jones (born August 18, 1972) is an American former Olympic and professional boxer.  Nicknamed "The Snake", Jones won the National Golden Gloves 1994 and 1995 and the Heavyweight bronze medal at the 1996 Summer Olympics.

Amateur career
 Winner of the Heavyweight bronze medal representing the United States at the 1996 Olympics in Atlanta. His results were:
 1st round bye
 Defeated Fola Okesola (Great Britain) RSC 3 (2:53)
 Defeated Jiang Tao (China) 21-4
 Lost to David Defiagbon (Canada) 10-16
 National Golden Gloves Heavyweight Champion (1994, 1995)

Professional career
Jones began his career undefeated in 17 fights over opponents. In his first test against Friday Ahunanya, Jones lost a split decision. After two victories over limited foes, Jones stepped up against future titlist Lamon Brewster, who defeated Jones by TKO in round 3. Shortly after the loss, Jones retired after doctors diagnosed him with diminished reflexes and speech.

Professional record

|-
| colspan="8" | 18 Wins (9 knockouts, 9 decisions), 2 Losses (1 knockout, 1 decision), 1 Draw 
|-
| style="border-style: none none solid solid; background: #e3e3e3" | Result
| style="border-style: none none solid solid; background: #e3e3e3" | Record
| style="border-style: none none solid solid; background: #e3e3e3" | Opponent
| style="border-style: none none solid solid; background: #e3e3e3" | Type
| style="border-style: none none solid solid; background: #e3e3e3" | Round
| style="border-style: none none solid solid; background: #e3e3e3" | Date
| style="border-style: none none solid solid; background: #e3e3e3" | Location
| style="border-style: none none solid solid; background: #e3e3e3" | Notes
|- align=center
| Loss
| 
| align=left |  Lamon Brewster
| TKO
| 3
| 2002-02-02
| align=left |  Reading, Pennsylvania, United States
| align=left | 
|-
| Win
| 
| align=left |  Drexie James
| TKO
| 4
| 2001-12-15
| align=left |  Mashantucket, Connecticut, United States
| align=left | 
|-
| Win
| 
| align=left |  Antonio Colbert
| UD
| 6
| 2001-08-24
| align=left |  Rosemont, Illinois, United States
| align=left | 
|-
| Loss
| 
| align=left |  Friday Ahunanya
| SD
| 12
| 2001-03-03
| align=left |  Las Vegas, Nevada, United States
| align=left | 
|-
| Win
| 
| align=left |  Sam Hampton
| TKO
| 2
| 2000-11-28
| align=left |  Las Vegas, Nevada, United States
| align=left | 
|-
| Win
| 
| align=left |  Derrick Banks
| UD
| 12
| 2000-09-16
| align=left |  Las Vegas, Nevada, United States
| align=left | 
|-
| Win
| 
| align=left |  Anthony Willis
| UD
| 10
| 2000-05-25
| align=left |  Tunica, Mississippi, United States
| align=left | 
|-
| Win
| 
| align=left |  Matt Green
| KO
| 1
| 2000-02-29
| align=left |  Las Vegas, Nevada, United States
| align=left | 
|-
| Win
| 
| align=left |  Sedreck Fields
| UD
| 8
| 1999-12-18
| align=left |  Tunica, Mississippi, United States
| align=left | 
|-
| Win
| 
| align=left |  Wesley Martin
| UD
| 8
| 1999-07-24
| align=left |  Las Vegas, Nevada, United States
| align=left | 
|-
| Win
| 
| align=left |  Bryant Smith
| KO
| 1
| 1999-03-13
| align=left |  New York City, United States
| align=left | 
|-
| Win
| 
| align=left |  Joseph Vegas
| UD
| 6
| 1998-12-18
| align=left |  Fort Lauderdale, Florida, United States
| align=left | 
|-
| Win
| 
| align=left |  Anthony Moore
| UD
| 6
| 1998-11-13
| align=left |  Las Vegas, Nevada, United States
| align=left | 
|-
| Win
| 
| align=left |  Brian Chitwood
| KO
| 1
| 1998-09-19
| align=left |  Atlanta, Georgia, United States
| align=left | 
|-
|Draw
| 
| align=left |  John Kiser
| MD
| 8
| 1998-05-29
| align=left |  Las Vegas, Nevada, United States
| align=left | 
|-
| Win
| 
| align=left |  David Ballanger
| KO
| 1
| 1998-04-10
| align=left |  Rosemont, Illinois, United States
| align=left | 
|-
| Win
| 
| align=left |  Wilbert Young
| TKO
| 1
| 1998-01-31
| align=left |  Tampa, Florida, United States
| align=left | 
|-
| Win
| 
| align=left |  Charles Cue
| KO
| 1
| 1997-12-13
| align=left |  Pompano Beach, Florida, United States
| align=left | 
|-
| Win
| 
| align=left |  Willie Chapman
| UD
| 4
| 1997-06-28
| align=left |  Las Vegas, Nevada, United States
| align=left | 
|-
| Win
| 
| align=left |  Ricardo Phillips
| PTS
| 4
| 1997-03-29
| align=left |  Las Vegas, Nevada, United States
| align=left | 
|-
| Win
| 
| align=left |  Jerry Barnes
| TKO
| 1
| 1997-01-11
| align=left |  Nashville, Tennessee, United States
| align=left | 
|}

After boxing
Jones appeared on an episode of HBO's Mayweather-Hatton 24/7 series as an assistant trainer to Floyd Mayweather Jr.  Mayweather, a friend of Jones from the U.S. Olympic Team, offered Jones a job as an assistant. He was again seen in Showtime's 'Inside Mayweather vs Pacquiao' training Floyd and giving insight to their friendship and time in the olympics together. Nate is now an established member of TMT (The Money Team) and is said to be one of Mayweathers ''strategists'.

References 

1972 births
Boxers at the 1996 Summer Olympics
National Golden Gloves champions
Olympic bronze medalists for the United States in boxing
Heavyweight boxers
Living people
Boxers from Chicago
American male boxers
Medalists at the 1996 Summer Olympics